Joseph William Bean (March 18, 1874 – February 15, 1961) was a shortstop in Major League Baseball. He played for the New York Giants in 1902.

Career
In 1902, Bean spent less than half a season in the major leagues with the Giants. In that time he played 50 games, but he committed 32 errors and he was released from the team in July when John McGraw was named player-manager of the Giants. Twenty-one players had committed more errors than Bean did in 1902, but nineteen of those players had appeared in at least 100 games that season. 

After his lone season in the major leagues, Bean returned to the minor leagues and played there through 1909. He also became the baseball coach at Marist College in Atlanta. In 1904, he converted one of his players, Ed Lafitte, from catcher to pitcher. Lafitte later pitched in the major leagues for several years. Bean succeeded John Heisman as the coach of the Georgia Tech Yellow Jackets baseball team and served in that role between 1918 and 1920. He also coached the school's basketball team in 1921.

References

External links

1874 births
1961 deaths
Major League Baseball shortstops
New York Giants (NL) players
Baseball players from Boston
Basketball coaches from Massachusetts
Minor league baseball managers
Augusta Kennebecs players
Newport Colts players
Rochester Patriots players
Ottawa Wanderers players
Rochester Bronchos players
Worcester Farmers players
Providence Grays (minor league) players
Jersey City Skeeters players
St. Paul Saints (AA) players
Lawrence Colts players
Georgia Bulldogs baseball coaches
Georgia Tech Yellow Jackets baseball coaches
Georgia Tech Yellow Jackets men's basketball coaches